Waltendorf is the 9th district of the Austrian city of Graz. It borders the districts of Ries to the north, St. Peter to the south and St. Leonhard mostly to the west. It had a population of 11,619 in 2010 and covers an area of 4.48 square kilometres. The postal codes of Waltendorf are 8010, 8042, 8043, 8047. 
There are two small castles in the district the 'Schloss Lustbühel' and the 'Hallerschloss', as well as a church the 'Rupertikirche' in 'Hohenrain'. Within the north of the district, next to the Ragnitz brook, there is one of the largest collection of high-risers in Graz, called 'Berliner Ring'. Some of the high risers have the solar water heating systems on their roof tops.

References